is a passenger railway station on the Yokohama Line located in the city of Machida, Tokyo, Japan, operated by the East Japan Railway Company (JR East).

Lines

Station layout
The station consists of a single elevated island platform serving two tracks, with the station building located underneath. The station has a Midori no Madoguchi staffed ticket office.

Platforms

History
The station opened on 1 April 1979. It became part of the East Japan Railway Company (JR East) with the breakup of the Japanese National Railways on 1 April 1987.

Station numbering was introduced on 20 August 2016 with Naruse being assigned station number JH22.

Passenger statistics
In fiscal 2019, the station was used by an average of 19,096 passengers daily (boarding passengers only).

Surrounding area
Showa Pharmaceutical University

See also
 List of railway stations in Japan

References

External links

 JR East station information 

Railway stations in Japan opened in 1979
Railway stations in Tokyo
Yokohama Line
Stations of East Japan Railway Company
Machida, Tokyo